Ana Maria Copado Amoros (born 31 March 1980 in Terrassa) is a Spanish female water polo goalkeeper. At the 2012 Summer Olympics, she competed for the Spain women's national water polo team in the women's event, where they won the silver medal. She is 5 ft 11 inches tall.

See also
 Spain women's Olympic water polo team records and statistics
 List of Olympic medalists in water polo (women)
 List of women's Olympic water polo tournament goalkeepers

References

External links
 

1980 births
Living people
Sportspeople from Terrassa
Spanish female water polo players
Water polo goalkeepers
Water polo players at the 2012 Summer Olympics
Medalists at the 2012 Summer Olympics
Olympic silver medalists for Spain in water polo
21st-century Spanish women
Water polo players from Catalonia
Sportswomen from Catalonia